Arthrostylidium is a Neotropical genus of climbing bamboo in the grass family. the species are native to Central America, the West Indies, northern South America, and southern Mexico.

Species

Formerly included
see Ampelocalamus Aulonemia Colanthelia Chusquea Didymogonyx Guadua Rhipidocladum

See also
List of Poaceae genera

References

 
Bambusoideae genera